Charles 'Charlie' Michael McLean Hill (born 27 May 1985) is an English former first-class cricketer.

Hill was born at Wimbledon in May 1985. He was educated at Tonbridge School, before going up to Trinity College, Oxford. While studying at Oxford, he made three first-class appearances against Cambridge University in The University Matches of 2007, 2008 and 2009. He scored a total of 90 runs in his three matches, with a high score of 29. With his off break bowling, he took 2 wickets from 73 overs bowled.

References

External links

1985 births
Living people
People from Wimbledon, London
Cricketers from Greater London
People educated at Tonbridge School
Alumni of Trinity College, Oxford
English cricketers
Oxford University cricketers